The G.T. Wilburn Grist Mill is in the Fall River community, in Leoma, Tennessee.

Geography
Its elevation is 774 feet. Fall River appears on the Bodenham U.S. Geological Survey Map. Lawrence County is in the Central Time Zone. Fall River lies within the (931) area code.

Fall River is a community located within the region of Leoma, Tennessee. The population is not reported but is believed to be approximately 300. Leoma is an unincorporated community located in Lawrence County, Tennessee.

Lawrence County, Tennessee, is a county located in the U.S. state of Tennessee. As of the 2013 census, the population was 41,990. Its county seat and largest city is Lawrenceburg, Tennessee.

The nearest city with population of 200,000 or more is Nashville, Tennessee. It is approximately 76 miles north and has a population of 609,644 as of 2011.

The coordinates are 35°07'49.9"N 87°13'04.0"W.

The mill is located just 13 miles from the David Crockett State Park in Lawrenceburg, Tennessee.

Mount Zion United Methodist Church is a historic church in Lawrence County, Tennessee, near the Fall River community.

History
The mill and general store served as the center of the Fall River settlement in the Clear Creek Valley in 1823. As the settlement grew and prospered, two churches, a school, a blacksmith shop, a tannery, a timber sawmill, a sorghum mill, and a cemetery were also built. For the next 130 years, the mill, general store and the home place served many needs. In addition to grinding wheat, corn and livestock feed, the store served as a post office, restaurant, operating theatre, judges' court room, voting place, political speaking place, library, boxing matches, horseshoe pitching tournaments, checkers tournaments, circuit church and almost everything else one could imagine prosperous Clear Creek Valley. The lives of many of the Valley's folk were shattered, but as soon as the war ended they went to work rebuilding the once proud Fall River community that embodied the true pioneer spirit of the times.

In 1862, at the beginning of the Civil War, the Union Army raided through middle Tennessee and following a "scorched earth" policy, they burned the mill to the ground. Fortunately the mill owner and his family's lives were spared, but it was a devastating blow to the very peaceful and once proud Fall River community that embodied the true pioneer spirit of the times.

Twenty years later, in 1885, the first family members of the current owners of the Fall River community properties arrived and infused new cutting technologies and equipment for wheat and corn grinding. They built a dam across the Clear Creek at the head of the bluffs creating a large thirty-acre millpond that would allow the mill to operate 24/7 even when the creek was low during drought seasons. Fall River was once again on the rise and its success helped revitalize and stabilize the Clear Creek Valley for the next 50 years.

In 1914 G. T. Wilburn (the second generation of current owners) took over the management of the mill and the general store. Under his guidance and stewardship the mills' productivity grew. His ingenious ability to adapt paired with his acclaimed knowledge of how to grind the best wheat and corn products brought regional fame to the mill. It also brought new customers from a fifty-mile radius as the Henry Ford automobile and truck ownership grew. In 1924 G.T. and his wife Florence bought out the other family members and dedicated their lives to the Fall River community.
Take a 200-year walk back in time to the early 1800s as you stroll around the historic water-powered mill at Fall River. Above the great waterfalls, you can hear the faint voices of the mule drivers and creaking wagon wheels early in the morning as they arrive with their heavy loads of wheat and corn and line up for what will be a long day at the mill. But these early pioneers are happy to be here, to meet their neighbors, trade stories, get up-to-date on local happenings and shop for necessities at the general store as they await the grinding of what will be their survival food for the coming winter.

Timeline
·1823– Construction began and the exact date of completion is unknown on the original Mill.

·John A. Hagan was the first recorded deed owner. It was a water driven mill.

·1862 – The Union Army burned the Mill to the ground as they swept through the South on a "scorched earth" policy. Fortunately the          Hagan Family was spared.

·1865 – Summer, the Civil War was over and John Hagan began rebuilding the Mill on the same spot as the burned mill.

·1870 – Ownership passed from John Hagan to the Scott family.

.1885 – Ownership passed to the White family and they installed a dam and a water driven turbine that powered the machinery for grinding fine flour that is still in the Mill today.

·1909 – Mr. White employed G. T. Wilburn (his wife Tenny's nephew) to manage the Mill and the Mill's Country store.

·1924 – G. T. Wilburn and his wife Florence purchased the Mill, Mill Store, farm house, barn and small rental house (all covering 15 acres) and he renamed the Mill and Country Store as G. T. Wilburn and Son's Mill and General Store.

References

External links
 Official website

Photo gallery

 

Buildings and structures in Lawrence County, Tennessee
Flour mills in the United States
Grinding mills in Tennessee